Archaeomythology refers to the study of archaeology through the discipline of mythology. It is an approach developed by Marija Gimbutas and mainly applied to Eastern European countries. Commenting in The Oxford Handbook of the Archaeology of Ritual and Religion, Tõnno Jonuks wrote "Despite stressing the importance of archaeology and using its sources to a greater extent than any other school in the Baltic countries, studies of archaeomythology are still based upon folklore and archaeology has only been used selectively. The greater part of archaeological material which could not be reconciled with folklore has been left out and many phenomena of past religions have thus not been discussed as they "cannot be compared with folklore."

See also 

 Biblical archaeology
 Pseudoarchaeology
 Nationalist historiography
 Indigenous archaeology
 Thor Heyerdahl

References

External links
 Institute of Archaeomythology

Archaeological sub-disciplines
Mythology